Addada  is a village in the southern state of Andhra Pradesh, India. It is located in the Pamarru taluk of Krishna district in Andhra Pradesh.

References

External links
 

Villages in Krishna district